Gav Bandi (also Romanized as Gāv Bandī) is a village in Kangan Rural District, in the Central District of Jask County, Hormozgan Province, Iran. At the 2006 census, its population was 256, in 38 families.

References 

Populated places in Jask County